Mount Lewis may refer to:
Mount Lewis (Antarctica), a summit in Victoria Land
Mount Lewis (California), a summit on the Sierra Crest
Mount Lewis (Nevada) in the Shoshone Range of Nevada, near Lewis Peak
Mount Lewis (Yukon), a summit in Saint Cyr Range, Canada
Mount Lewis, New South Wales, a suburb of the City of Bankstown
Mount Lewis National Park, near Cairns in Queensland, Australia.